Brimscombe Bridge Halt was opened on 1 February 1904 on what is now the Golden Valley Line between  and . This line was opened in 1845 as the Cheltenham and Great Western Union Railway from Swindon to Gloucester and this was one of many small stations and halts built on this line for the local passenger service.
Access to the basic wooden platforms was from the overbridge. Each with GWR pagoda style shelters soon after opening and electric lighting was installed in February 1939 at an estimated cost of £90.

Closure of the halt came on 2 November 1964 following the withdrawal of local stopping passenger services on the line. No trace of the halt remains today, but there are some traces of the access paths.

Services
This halt was served by the Gloucester to Chalford local passenger services, known as the Chalford Auto.

References

Stroud District
Disused railway stations in Gloucestershire
Former Great Western Railway stations
Railway stations in Great Britain opened in 1904
Railway stations in Great Britain closed in 1964
Beeching closures in England